In the 1996–97 season, USM Alger competed in the Division 1 for the 21st time They competed in Ligue 1, the Algerian Cup, and the CAF Champions League. In 1996–97 Algerian Cup in the Round of 16 in a match that was expected against CS Constantine, but CSC withdrew and did not come to the stadium Where were they accused of collusion in order for USMA to facilitate its mission in the last round match of the National 1, then the road was not easy to reach the final where faced CA Batna and won by Tarek Ghoul goal, but this victory was without joy because of what happened after the end of the game in the middle of the black decade On a Eid al-Fitr, three USMA supporters who were celebrating the Algerian Cup won by their team are murdered in a false dam at Frais Vallon.

Squad list
Players and squad numbers last updated on 8 January 1997.Note: Flags indicate national team as has been defined under FIFA eligibility rules. Players may hold more than one non-FIFA nationality.

Competitions

Overview

Division 1

League table

Results summary

Results by round

Matches

Algerian Cup

CAF Champions League

First round

Second round

Squad information

Playing statistics

|-

|-
! colspan=12 style=background:#dcdcdc; text-align:center| Players transferred out during the season

Goalscorers
Includes all competitive matches. The list is sorted alphabetically by surname when total goals are equal.

Transfers

In

Out

References

External links
 
 Source of local newspapers 1996–97 season

USM Alger seasons
Algerian football clubs 1996–97 season